Nuka Island is an island in the northern Gulf of Alaska in Kenai Peninsula Borough, Alaska, United States. It lies just off the southeastern corner of the Kenai Peninsula, across the Nuka Pass from the mainland. The island has a land area of 62.271 km2 (24.043 sq mi) and is unpopulated.

Demographics

Nuka Island reported a population as an unincorporated entity separately on the 1940 U.S. Census. This was the only time it reported as such.

References

Nuka Island: Block 1131, Census Tract 12, Kenai Peninsula Borough, Alaska United States Census Bureau

Islands of Alaska
Islands of Kenai Peninsula Borough, Alaska
Uninhabited islands of Alaska